Vexillum pagodula is a species of small sea snail, marine gastropod mollusk in the family Costellariidae, the ribbed miters.

Description
The length of the shell attains 5 mm.

Distribution
This marine species occurs off the Philippines and Guam.

References

 Hervier, J. "Descriptions d'especes nouvelles de mollusques, provenant de l'Archipel de la Nouvelle-Caledonie (suite)." Journ. de Conchyl. 46 (1897): 3a.

pagodula
Gastropods described in 1897